Wieghorst is a surname. Notable people with the surname include:

 (born 1871), Danish photographer
 Morten Wieghorst (born 1971), Danish football player and manager
 Olaf Wieghorst (1899–1988), Danish-born American painter